Finn Urdal (born 9 September 1944) is a retired Norwegian handball player who competed in the 1972 Summer Olympics.

He was born in Horten and represented the club Fredensborg/Ski HK. In 1972 he was part of the Norwegian team which finished ninth in the Olympic tournament. He played three matches and scored three goals.

References

1944 births
Living people
Norwegian male handball players
Olympic handball players of Norway
Handball players at the 1972 Summer Olympics
People from Horten
Sportspeople from Vestfold og Telemark